A bellhop (North America), or hotel porter (international), is a hotel employee who helps patrons with their luggage while checking in or out. Bellhops often wear a uniform (see bell-boy hat), like certain other page boys or doormen. This occupation is also known as a  bellman and bellboy in North America.

Duties
The name bellhop is derived from a hotel's front-desk clerk ringing a bell to summon a porter, who would hop (jump) to attention at the desk to receive instructions. It is short for bell-hopper, and the first known use of the word was in 1897.
 
The bellhop traditionally is a boy or adolescent male, hence the term bellboy. Bellhops interact with a variety of people each day and duties often include opening the front door, moving luggage, valeting cars, calling cabs, transporting guests, advising directions, performing basic concierge work, and responding to  guests' needs. While carrying luggage, they escort guests to their rooms.

In most countries, it is customary to tip a bellhop for his service.

See also
Porter (carrier)
Skycap

References

External links

Hospitality occupations
Personal care and service occupations